The 1983 EuroHockey Club Champions Cup was the tenth installment of Europe's premier field hockey club competition. It was won by defending champions Dynamo Almaty on HC Klein Zwitserland in a replay of the past edition's final match, confirming the progress of Soviet hockey. 1976-78 champions Southgate HC attained the third place.

1st division (The Hague)

Group stage

Group A
  Dynamo Almaty - 5 points
  Southgate HC - 4 points
  HC Heidelberg - 2 points
 HC Amiens - 1 point

Group B
  HC Klein Zwitserland - 5 points
  Real Club de Polo, Barcelona - 3 points
  Uccle Sport - 3 points
  Rock Gunners - 0 points

Play-offs

Final
 Dynamo Almaty 4-2 HC Klein Zwitserland

3rd place
 Southgate HC 3-1 Real Club de Polo, Barcelona

5th place
 Uccle Sport 3-0 HC Heidelberg

7th place
 HC Amiens 2-0 Rock Gunners

Standings
  Dynamo Almaty  (defending champions)
  HC Klein Zwitserland
  Southgate HC
  Real Club de Polo, Barcelona 
  Uccle Sport
  HC Heidelberg
  HC Amiens
  Rock Gunners

  France and  Gibraltar are relegated to 2nd Division for the 1984 Champions Cup.

2nd Division (Subotica)

Group stage

Group A
  Branbridge HC - 6 points
  HK Suboticanka - 3 points
  Rot-Weiss Wettingen - 2 points
  Postsportverein Wien

Group B
  Marilena Rome - 4
  Cardiff HC - 1
  Slavia Prague - 1

Play-offs

1st place
 Marilena Rome 2-0 Banbridge HC

3rd place
 HK Suboticanka 5-0 Cardiff HC

5th place
 Slavia Prague 1-0 Rot-Weiss Wettingen

Standings
  Marilena Rome
  Banbridge HC
  HK Suboticanka
  Cardiff HC
  Slavia Prague
  Rot-Weiss Wettingen
  Postsportverein Wien

 Italy and Ireland are promoted to 1st Division for the 1984 Champions Cup.

References
  European Hockey Federation

EuroHockey Club Champions Cup
International field hockey competitions hosted by the Netherlands
EuroHockey Club Champions Cup
EuroHockey Club Champions Cup
EuroHockey Club Champions Cup
International sports competitions hosted by Yugoslavia